Helder, Helm and Hoorn are adjacent oil fields located in the Netherlands sector of the North Sea 40 km west of Den Helder and 80 km north west of Amsterdam.

The fields 
The Helder, Helm and Hoorn oil fields are located in Block Q of the Netherlands sector of the North Sea. The oil reservoirs are Lower Cretaceous Vieland Sandstone with oils of various properties. The total reserves in the Q Block are estimated to be 53.9 million barrels. The fields were licensed to Unocal Netherlands BV.

Development 
The fields were developed though a number of offshore installations.

Early years production (in 1000 stock tank barrels) from the fields were:

From 1984 Helder A received oil production from the Kotter production platform by 27.4 km 12-inch diameter pipeline.

To increase production, in 1991 Unocal drilled 5 horizontal wells and horizontal laterals from 9 of the existing wells in the Helder field. Prior to this programme the field was producing 4200 bbl/d, when complete the production had increased to 10,900 bbl/d.

See also 

 Kotter and Logger oil and gas fields 
K7-K12 gas fields 
K13 gas fields 
L10 gas field 
L4-L7 gas fields

References 

North Sea
North Sea oil fields
Oil fields in the Netherlands